Boris Khabalovich Shukhov (born 8 May 1947) is a retired Soviet cyclist. He was part of the Soviet team that finished in ninth place at the 1968 Summer Olympics and won a gold medal in the 100 km team time trial at the 1972 Summer Olympics. At the world championships, he won a gold medal in 1970 and a silver in 1973 in the same event. Individually, he won the Tour de Bretagne Cycliste in 1973.

References

1947 births
Living people
Olympic cyclists of the Soviet Union
Olympic gold medalists for the Soviet Union
Cyclists at the 1968 Summer Olympics
Cyclists at the 1972 Summer Olympics
Olympic medalists in cycling
Soviet male cyclists
Medalists at the 1972 Summer Olympics
UCI Road World Champions (elite men)
People from Odesa Oblast